Ismar Schorsch (born November 3, 1935, in Hanover, Germany) is the Chancellor emeritus of The Jewish Theological Seminary (JTS) and the Rabbi Herman Abramovitz Professor of Jewish history.

Schorsch served as the sixth Chancellor at JTS for approximately 20 years, from March 1986 until his retirement in June 2006. He was succeeded by Arnold Eisen.

Books

Jewish Reactions to German Anti-Semitism, 1870–1914. New York: Columbia University Press, 1972.
From Text to Context: The Turn to History in Modern Judaism. Hanover, N.H.: University Press of New England, 1994.
The Sacred Cluster: The Core Values of Conservative Judaism. New York: The Department of Communications of the Jewish Theological Seminary of America, 1995. (Outlining what he calls the seven clusters of Conservative Judaism.)
Canon Without Closure: Torah Commentaries. New York: Aviv Press, 2007.
Leopold Zunz: Creativity in Adversity. Philadelphia: University of Pennsylvania Press, 2016.

Personal life and education
He is the son of Hanover Rabbi Emil Schorsch. They both experienced the so-called "Reichskristallnacht" in Nazi Germany a different manner. Schorsch escaped to England in 1938 and emigrated to the United States in 1940.

Schorsch graduated from Ursinus College in 1957 and was ordained by JTS in 1962, holds master's degrees from JTS and Columbia University. He was awarded a PhD in Jewish History from Columbia University in 1969. He and his wife, Sally, have three grown children (Jonathan Schorsch, Rebecca Schorsch, and Naomi Stein) and eleven grandchildren (Ada, Livi, and Nathaniel Moses, Emanuel, Michal, Gedalia, Nava, and Jacob Schorsch, and Eve, Emmett, and Ruthie Stein).

Honors
Leo Baeck Medal (2015)

References

External links
alemannia-judaica to family Schorsch and the synagoge in Hüngheim, Germany
The Sacred Cluster by former JTS chancellor Ismar Schorsch

1935 births
Living people
American Conservative rabbis
American people of German-Jewish descent
American religion academics
Heads of universities and colleges in the United States
Columbia University alumni
Jewish Theological Seminary of America people
Ursinus College alumni
Officers Crosses of the Order of Merit of the Federal Republic of Germany
20th-century American rabbis
21st-century American rabbis